My Heart Incognito is a 1931 comedy film directed by André-Paul Antoine and Manfred Noa and starring Mady Christians. It was made by Germany's Aafa-Film as the French-language version of Lieutenant, Were You Once a Hussar?. Such multi-language versions were common during the early years of sound.

Cast

References

Bibliography

External links 
 

1931 films
1931 comedy films
German comedy films
Films of the Weimar Republic
1930s French-language films
Films directed by Manfred Noa
German multilingual films
German black-and-white films
1931 multilingual films
1930s German films